Glen or Glenda is a 1953 American exploitation film directed, written by and starring Ed Wood (credited in his starring role as "Daniel Davis"), and featuring Wood's then-girlfriend Dolores Fuller and Bela Lugosi. It was produced by George Weiss who also made the exploitation film Test Tube Babies that same year.

The film is a docudrama about cross-dressing and transvestism, and is semi-autobiographical in nature. Wood himself was a cross-dresser, and the film is a plea for tolerance. It was widely considered one of the worst films ever made upon release. However, it has since been reevaluated and has become a cult film due to its low-budget production values, idiosyncratic style, and early cinematic themes of transgender acceptance.

Plot
A police inspector investigating the suicide of a transvestite named Patrick/Patricia seeks the advice of Dr. Alton, who narrates for him the story of Glen/Glenda. 

Glen started out by asking to wear his sister's dress for a Halloween party. The narrative explains that Glen is a transvestite, but not a homosexual. He hides his cross-dressing from his fiancée, Barbara, fearing that she will reject him. She voices her suspicion that there is another woman in his life, unaware that the woman is his feminine alter ego, Glenda.

Alton narrates that Glen is torn between the idea of being honest with Barbara before their wedding or waiting until after. Glen confides in a transvestite friend of his, John, whose wife left him after catching him wearing her clothes.

Glen/Glenda is caught in a storm. The sound of thunder causes him to collapse to the floor. An extended dream sequence begins, containing several vignettes symbolically depicting Glen's struggle with his sexuality. Glen/Glenda wakes and decides to tell Barbara the truth. She initially reacts with distress, but ultimately decides to stay with him. She offers him an angora sweater as a sign of acceptance.

Back in Dr. Alton's office, he relates another narrative, this one concerning a World War II veteran named Alan who underwent sex reassignment surgery to become "a lovely young woman" named Anne.

Cast

 Bela Lugosi as Scientist/Spirit
 Ed Wood as Glen/Glenda
 Timothy Farrell as Dr. Alton/Narrator
 Dolores Fuller as Barbara
 'Tommy' Haynes as Alan/Anne
 Lyle Talbot as Inspector Warren
 Charlie Crafts as Johnny
 Conrad Brooks as Banker/Reporter/Pickup Artist/Bearded Drag
 William M. A. deOrgler aka Captain DeZita as The Devil

Production
Shot in four days, the film was loosely inspired by the sex reassignment surgery of Christine Jorgensen, which made national headlines in the U.S. in 1952. George Weiss, a Hollywood producer of low-budget films, commissioned a movie to exploit the case. Originally Weiss made Jorgensen several offers to appear in the film, but these were turned down. Wood convinced Weiss that his own transvestism made him the perfect director despite his modest resume. Wood was given the job, but instead made a movie about transvestism. Nonetheless, posters for the film still claimed it was based on Jorgensen's case.

Wood persuaded Lugosi, at the time poor and drug-addicted, to appear in the movie. Lugosi's scenes were shot at the Jack Miles Studios in Los Angeles. He was reportedly paid $5000 for the role, although some stories state the actual amount was only $1000. Lugosi is credited as "The Scientist", a character whose purpose is unclear. He acts as a sort of narrator but gives no narration relevant to the plot; that job is reserved for the film's primary narrator, Timothy Farrell.

This was the only film Wood directed but did not also produce. Wood played the eponymous character, but under the pseudonym "Daniel Davis". His then-girlfriend, Dolores Fuller, played Glen's girlfriend/fiancée Barbara. Wood later returned to Glen or Glenda in his pulp novel Killer in Drag (1963). The plot features a transvestite called Glen whose alter-ego is called Glenda. He is executed in the sequel Death of a Transvestite (1967) after a struggle for the right to go to the electric chair dressed as Glenda.

The erotic-themed vignettes were not created by Wood. They were reportedly added by producer George Weiss. He needed extra scenes to add to what he felt was an overly-short film. While not organic parts of the narrative, they seem to tell their own tales of gender dynamics and so fit in with the general themes of the film. The whipping scene suggests a master/slave relationship. That the man is dominant and the woman submissive, seems to reflect male chauvinism. The flirtatious and striptease-themed vignettes were typical of 1950s exploitation films and grindhouse films, as was the rape scene.

The film has deleted scenes. In the theatrical trailer, included in laserdisc and DVD editions, the scene in which Fuller hands over her angora sweater, is a different take than the one in the release version — in the trailer, she tosses it to Wood in a huff, while the release version shows her handing it over more acceptingly. There is also a shot of Wood in drag, mouthing the word "Cut!"

The second part of the film, titled Alan or Anne, is much shorter, told largely through stock footage, and was made to meet the distributor's demand for a sex change film. Alan is a pseudo-hermaphrodite who fights in World War II wearing women's underwear. After returning, Alan undergoes surgery to become a woman.

Release
Domestically, the film was limited in release, having been pre-sold to some theaters (under alternative titles such as I Led Two Lives, He or She? and I Changed My Sex). Internationally, the film was also limited, and in France and Belgium, the title was translated as Louis ou Louise and in Argentina as Yo Cambié Mi Sexo (I changed my sex); the film had a brief  screening in the Republic of China. It was re-released to theaters in 1981 by Paramount.

According to Tim Dirks, the film was one of a wave of "cheap teen movies" released for the drive-in market. They consisted of "exploitative, cheap fare created especially for them [teens] in a newly-established teen/drive-in genre."

It was denied classification by the British Board of Film Classification upon submission on February 26, 1958.

In 2009, Glen or Glenda became the final film to be restored and colorized by Legend Films, who subsequently released it on DVD.

Legacy
In 1980, Wood was posthumously given the accolade of 'Worst Director of All Time' at the Golden Turkey Awards, and a revival of interest in his work followed. This led to Glen or Glenda being reissued in 1982. This cut included six minutes of additional footage. One of the restored scenes features Glen rejecting a pass made to him by a man. At this point, the film was reviewed seriously, and reclaimed as a radical work, by Steve Jenkins in the Monthly Film Bulletin.

The critic Leonard Maltin names Glen or Glenda as "possibly the worst movie ever made".  Richard Barrios describes Glen or Glenda as "one of the funniest and worst movies ever made".

In his book Cult Movies 3, Danny Peary suggests this is actually a radical, if ineptly made, film that presents a far more personal story than is contained in films by more well-respected auteurs.

In 1994, Tim Burton chronicled the troubled production of Glen or Glenda in Ed Wood. The film includes re-creations of several key scenes, including Lugosi's narration and Glen's plea for his girlfriend's understanding at the end of the film.

This film was the inspiration of the characters, Glen and Glenda, in the Chucky franchise.

Director David Lynch has named the film as one of his favorites.

See also
 Transgender in film and television
 Cross-dressing in film and television
 List of films considered the worst
 Ed Wood filmography

References

Sources

 
 Rudolph Grey, Nightmare of Ecstasy: The Life and Art of Edward D. Wood, Jr. (1992) 
 The Haunted World of Edward D. Wood, Jr. (1996), a documentary film directed by Brett Thompson

Further reading

External links

 
 
 
 
 Glen or Glenda trailer is available for free download at the Internet Archive

1953 films
1953 drama films
1950s LGBT-related films
1950s teen films
American docudrama films
Films directed by Ed Wood
Transgender-related films
Cross-dressing in American films
Films about dreams
American sexploitation films
1950s English-language films
Films shot in Los Angeles
American black-and-white films
Films with screenplays by Ed Wood
Articles containing video clips
Films scored by William Lava
American LGBT-related films
1953 directorial debut films
Films about trans women
1950s exploitation films
Films originally rejected by the British Board of Film Classification
1950s rediscovered films
Rediscovered American films
1950s American films